Peacefully in Their Sleeps is a BBC Radio 4 comedy series written by Chris Chantler and Howard Read. Paying tribute to fictional celebrities, it lampoons postwar popular culture using fake archive footage and interviews. Six episodes were produced, and aired from July until September 2007.

Each episode memorialises a different fictional celebrity, with guest stars including Marcus Brigstocke, Elizabeth Spriggs, Richard Briers, Jeffrey Holland, Paul Putner, Phyllida Law and Dan Antopolski. Geoff McGivern plays the programme's presenter Roydon Postlethwaite.

Episode 1: Rene Fortesque-Spencer-French
Episode 2: Sir Matthias Blaggard
Episode 3: Jeff Peacock
Episode 4: Douggie 'The Shins' Wild
Episode 5: Dame Penelope Sway
Episode 6: Sister Cecilia of Caracas

External links
Guardian cites show as 'Pick of the Day'
Telegraph
Times

BBC Radio comedy programmes